is a Japanese footballer who plays for Suzuka Point Getters, on loan from Sagan Tosu.

Career
On 18 January 2023, Kodama was loaned to JFL club Suzuka Point Getters ahead of the 2023 season.

Career statistics

Club
.

Notes

References

External links

2002 births
Living people
Japanese footballers
Association football forwards
Sagan Tosu players
SC Sagamihara players
Renofa Yamaguchi FC players
Suzuka Point Getters players
J1 League players
J2 League players
Japan Football League players